The Wild, the Willing and the Innocent is the ninth studio album by English hard rock band UFO, released in January 1981. Their first to be entirely self-produced. Its song "Lonely Heart" was a minor UK hit.

Former Wild Horses' keyboard player Neil Carter replaced Paul Raymond, who had left to join the Michael Schenker Group after a disagreement with singer Phil Mogg. However, according to guitarist Paul Chapman, Carter – though credited on the sleeve – did not play keyboards on the album (see below).

The original cover was, as usual, designed by the art studio Hipgnosis.

The album was remastered at Sound Recording Technology in Cambridge in 1994 and reissued on Repertoire Records. The album was also reissued in 2009, remastered and with an expanded booklet and bonus tracks.

Track listing

On the original US vinyl release, the tracks (on both sides) were numbered 1, 2, 3, 5.

Singles
"Couldn't Get It Right"/"Hot 'n' Ready" (recorded live at the Reading Festival 1980) (Chrysalis CHS 2454)
"Lonely Heart"/"Long Gone" (Chrysalis CHS 2482) #41 UK

Credits
UFO
Phil Mogg – vocals
Pete Way – bass
Andy Parker – drums
Paul Chapman – guitars
Neil Carter – keyboards (not played but listed), guitar, backing vocals, saxophone on "Lonely Heart"

Additional musicians
John Sloman – keyboards (uncredited)
Paul Buckmaster – orchestral arrangements, orchestra conductor

Production
Steve Churchyard, Gary Edwards, Jeremy Green – engineers

Charts

References

UFO (band) albums
1981 albums
Albums with cover art by Hipgnosis
Chrysalis Records albums